Archidesmus is an extinct millipede genus from the Lower Devonian Old Red Sandstone of the United Kingdom. It is the only member of the taxonomic family Archidesmidae. The type species Archidesmus macnicoli was described by British paleontologist Benjamin Peach in 1882. A second species, A. loganensis was also described by Peach but its status as a valid species- or even a myriapod- is debated.

References

†Archidesmus
Devonian myriapods
Fossils of Great Britain
Fossil taxa described in 1882
Extinct animals of Europe
Prehistoric myriapod genera